Rauda Morcos is a Palestinian poet and LGBTIQ activist living in Haifa in Israel. In 2003, she was outed as a lesbian by a national newspaper, leading to dismissal from her job, physical assaults and attacks on her car. She then set up Aswat, the first Palestinian group dedicated to supporting lesbians.

Career 
In 2003, Morcos lost her job as a youth educator after she was interviewed for Yedioth Ahronoth (an Israeli tabloid newspaper) about her poetry. The journalist promised not to reveal her sexual orientation but then outed her as a lesbian, which led to her being physically assaulted and her car being damaged many times. She received anonymous threats and was concerned for her life.

Morcos then set up Aswat ("Voices") in 2003 as an organisation supporting lesbians and bisexual, inter-sex, queer, transsexual, transgender and questioning women. It was based in Haifa and the first regional group to offer support to lesbian Palestinians. The International Gay and Lesbian Human Rights Commission (now OutRight Action International) presented its Felipa de Souza Award to Morcos in May 2006, recognising her work with Aswat. She was the first Arab person to receive the award. Aswat held its first conference in Haifa in 2007, with 350 attendees.

Taking a post-colonial stance, Morcos has argued that human rights aid organisations from the United States and Western Europe can be patronising to Arab communities. She has also drawn attention to the links between the Israeli repression of Palestinians and gay people, criticising the Israeli LGBT rights movement for not focusing more upon it. She commented that "I think the Palestinian identity and the Queer identity converge in being both marginalized and they are both about resisting oppression".

Morcos has worked as a regional advisor for organisations including the Astraea Lesbian Foundation for Justice, the Coalition of Women for Peace, the Global Fund for Women, Human Rights Watch and Mama Cash. As of 2012, she was working freelance for Hivos, a Dutch development aid organisation, and pursuing a law degree at the Carmel Academic Center in Haifa.

Activism 
Morcos said in 2008 that gay Palestinians are sometimes blackmailed by Israeli intelligence into outing them if they do not collaborate.

In August 2020, Morcos spoke about a positive change in the Palestinian community's treatment of LBGTQ members after the funeral of Ayman Safieh, who was a leading member of the Palestinian queer community.

References 

Palestinian women poets
Lesbian feminists
Lesbian poets
People from Haifa
Year of birth missing (living people)
Palestinian LGBT people
Israeli lesbian writers
Israeli LGBT poets
Israeli LGBT rights activists
Human Rights Watch people
Felipa de Souza Award
Living people